Merete Fjeldavlie (born 13 August 1968 in Oslo) is a retired Norwegian alpine skier. In March 1992 she won a World Cup race in Super-G in Vail, beating Petra Kronberger and Carole Merle. That season she came second in the overall Super-G World Cup. She didn't achieve any podium finishes in the major championships; her best placing was 9th in the downhill event at the 2001 World Championships in St. Anton. She retired from alpine skiing in 2002.

References

External links
 
 

1968 births
Living people
Norwegian female alpine skiers
Olympic alpine skiers of Norway
Alpine skiers at the 1992 Winter Olympics
Alpine skiers from Oslo